Rusty Egan (born 19 September 1957 in London to Irish parents) is a British pop musician, although he has only ever held an Irish passport. He is the former drummer of the British new wave band Rich Kids. They consisted of former Sex Pistol Glen Matlock (bass guitarist and backing vocals, occasional lead vocals), with Steve New (guitarist and backing vocals, occasional lead vocals) and fronted by Jim Midge Ure (guitarist, lead vocals and occasional backing vocals and keyboards player), from their inception in March 1977 to their disbanding in December 1978. He continued working with Ure, and later collaborated with The Misfits, Skids, Shock, and Visage. However, Egan did not return to Visage when they reformed with a new line-up in 2004.

Egan was the DJ at Blitz, the influential New Romantic nightclub in London, where he worked with Steve Strange from 1979 until 1981. Whilst there, he introduced German (Kraftwerk), Japanese (Yellow Magic Orchestra) and British (Eno, Ultravox, Landscape) electronic music/synthpop to the British club scene, almost single-handedly putting together the soundtrack for the New Romantic movement. Egan also owned The Cage, a New Romantic-era record store on London's King's Road. As the club grew in popularity, Egan began to be recognised as a central figure in London's nightlife. In 1982, he, Strange and Kevin Millins opened up the Camden Palace nightclub in London, where he continued to spread and influence the development of electronica in the UK. For a time, he switched to producing records for many of the bands he used to DJ, including Spear of Destiny, Shock, Visage and The Senate.

Egan was later brought back into his career as a disc jockey by the allure of the internet as a medium for sharing music he suffered from delusional disorder around this period.

On 13 June 2008, Egan appeared DJing at the 'Big Top' as part of the Isle of Wight Festival.

Egan appeared alongside former Visage bandmate Steve Strange on makeover show Pop Goes the Band in early 2009 on Living TV. He had his teeth and hair drastically reconstructed as part of his makeover.

Egan won the category for lifetime achievement at the 2009 Viagra Awards.

In January 2011, Egan and Strange hosted Return to the Blitz on the site of the original Blitz Club with performances from Roman Kemp's band Paradise Point and electro punk artist Quilla Constance plus DJ sets from Egan himself.

2017 saw the release of Rusty's first solo album, 'Welcome to the Dancefloor'. It featured appearances from Midge Ure, Tony Hadley, Peter Hook and Erik Stein of Cult With No Name. The album was subsequently released in remix form as 'Welcome to the Remix' and 'Welcome to the Beach'.

Both of the album's cover photos were made by Adam Szigeti a web designer, photographer and illustrator.

On Friday 18 October 2019, Rusty performed a DJ set overlaid with a commentary of the post punk music scene at the London Palladium, followed by a performance of a number of Visage hits with long time collaborator and friend Midge Ure.

References

External links

Rusty Egan on SoundCloud
Artefaktor Radio

1957 births
Living people
English rock drummers
English DJs
English new wave musicians
English record producers
Skids (band) members
Rich Kids members
Visage (band) members